The 2024 United States Senate election in California will be held on November 5, 2024, to elect a member of the United States Senate to represent the state of California. California uses a nonpartisan blanket primary, in which all candidates regardless of party affiliation appear on the same primary ballot and the two highest-placing candidates advance to the general election.

Incumbent five-term Democratic Senator Dianne Feinstein will be retiring in 2025 at the end of the 118th Congress. Two Democratic U.S. Representatives, Katie Porter of Irvine and Adam Schiff of Los Angeles, entered the race prior to Feinstein announcing her retirement. A third, Barbara Lee of Oakland, declared her campaign on February 21. This is only the second open Senate race in California in the past thirty years, and the first open race for the Class I seat since 1982.

Candidates

Democratic Party

Declared

Publicly expressed interest

Potential
 Xavier Becerra, U.S. Secretary of Health and Human Services (2021–present), former Attorney General of California (2017–2021), and former U.S. Representative for California's 34th congressional district (1993–2017)	
 Eleni Kounalakis, Lieutenant Governor of California (2019–present)
 Gavin Newsom, Governor of California (2019–present)

Declined
 Rob Bonta, Attorney General of California (2021–present)
 London Breed, mayor of San Francisco (2018–present) (endorsed Lee)
 Dianne Feinstein, incumbent U.S. Senator (1992–present)
 Holly Mitchell, Los Angeles County supervisor (2020–present) (running for re-election)
 Libby Schaaf, former mayor of Oakland (2015–2023) (endorsed Lee)

Republican Party

Declared
 Denice Gary-Pandol, educator

Filed paperwork
 Peter Liu, entrepreneur and candidate for Mayor of Oakland in 2018
 Barack Mandela, attorney

Publicly expressed interest
Eric Early, attorney and perennial candidate

Potential
Lanhee Chen, Stanford University professor and runner-up for California State Controller in 2022
Brian Dahle, state senator from the 1st district (2019–present) and runner-up for Governor of California in 2022
Larry Elder, radio host and candidate for Governor of California in 2021
Kevin Faulconer, former mayor of San Diego (2014–2020) and candidate for Governor of California in 2021
Mark Meuser, attorney and runner-up for U.S. Senate in 2022

Independents

Declined
Arnold Schwarzenegger, former Governor of California (2003–2011)

Primary election

Campaign

Media sources speculated for years that Dianne Feinstein might choose not to seek re-election in 2024 or resign before the end of her term, owing to her age, reports that her cognitive state was declining, and her decision not to take the position of Senate president pro tempore in the 118th Congress, third in line for the presidency, even though she would have been customarily offered the role as the most senior member of the majority caucus. There was also speculation that Feinstein might face opposition within the Democratic Party as she did in 2018, when she was challenged by fellow Democrat Kevin de León and defeated him by an unexpectedly narrow margin. In December 2022, Feinstein confirmed that she would not resign before the end of her term.

In January 2023, with the question of Feinstein's re-election decision still up in the air, Democratic U.S. Representative Katie Porter announced she would run for Senate.  She confirmed that she would stay in the race even if Feinstein chose to run for another term. Porter was first elected in 2018, unseating incumbent Republican Mimi Walters. She later gained national fame for her progressive politics and frequently went viral for grilling corporate executives during congressional hearings.

Two weeks later, Porter was joined by another Democratic member of the House, Adam Schiff, who said he had consulted with Feinstein before entering the race. A moderate Democrat who unseated incumbent Republican James Rogan in 2000, Schiff's profile rose significantly during the presidency of Donald Trump, owing to Schiff's role as a lead impeachment manager in the first impeachment of Donald Trump, his service on the January 6 Committee, and his frequent appearances on MSNBC.

A third Democratic House member, Barbara Lee, reportedly told members of the Congressional Black Caucus in January that she would also run for Senate. As she was already 76 years old in January 2023, Lee reportedly pitched herself to donors as a transitional Senator who would serve only one term. A longtime progressive first elected in a 1998 special election, Lee is known for being the only member of Congress to vote against the Authorization for Use of Military Force of 2001, which led to military deployment in Afghanistan and several other countries. Lee filed to run for Senate in early February 2023 and formally announced her campaign later that month.

Feinstein continued to demur on her re-election plans, at one point saying she would not announce her decision until 2024. However, in February 2023, she finally confirmed that she would retire, ending a political career that spanned over 50 years. The 2024 election is only the second California Senate race without an incumbent since 1992, with the other being the 2016 election following the retirement of Barbara Boxer. However, Politico pointed out that the 2016 election had an "early and prohibitive frontrunner" in Kamala Harris while the 2024 election has no clear frontrunner, and thus considered the 2024 election to be the first truly open California Senate race in 32 years.

Lee, Porter, and Schiff have similar voting records in Congress and similarly progressive policy platforms. As a result, they are expected to differentiate themselves from each other based on their life stories and individual strengths rather than their ideologies. However, all three have faced controversies that could damage their campaigns: Porter has been accused of mistreating congressional staff, Lee's age is seen as a potential issue, and Schiff is expected to face opposition from progressives due to his past support for overseas military intervention and for taking donations from groups affiliated with the oil, payday loan, and pharmaceutical industries, though he has declared he will not accept funds from corporate PACs in his Senate campaign. Other important factors include geography, as Schiff and Porter both represent southern California while Lee represents northern California, and diversity, as a victory by Schiff would leave California with no female Senators for the first time since 1992 while a victory by Lee would make her the first black woman in the Senate since Harris left office in 2021.

Schiff began 2023 with $20.6 million in his campaign account compared to $7.7 million for Porter and just under $55,000 for Lee. However, all three candidates quickly began raising large sums of money; for example, in the first 24 hours of her campaign, Porter raised over $1.3 million. The three also launched super PACs to aid with fundraising, each competing for the top California fundraising firms and consultants. Former Federal Election Commission chair Ann Ravel predicted that the race would turn out to be one of, if not the most the most expensive Senate race in history. The expensive nature of the race has led media sources to speculate that a wealthy candidate may decide to launch a self-funded campaign, akin to Rick Caruso's campaign in the 2022 Los Angeles mayoral election.

As of March 2023, no prominent Republicans have announced a campaign. This has been attributed to California's heavy Democratic lean and Republican donors being wary of the high cost of running a statewide campaign in California; GOP strategist Duane Dichiara estimated that a Republican would need at least $80 million to run a viable Senate campaign. Additionally, California's top-two primary system may allow two Democrats to advance to the general election, a scenario that played out in the 2016 and 2018 Senate races. However, the three-way division in the Democratic field could help a Republican reach the general election. Republicans will also benefit from the fact that the 2024 California Republican presidential primary, which will be held on the same day as the Senate primary, is expected to be hotly contested and entice Republican voters to turn out in higher numbers.

Endorsements

Polling

General election

Predictions

Polling
Katie Porter vs. Adam Schiff

Notes

References

External links
Official campaign websites 
Denice Gary-Pandol (R) for Senate
Barbara Lee (D) for Senate
Katie Porter (D) for Senate
Adam Schiff (D) for Senate

2024
California
United States Senate